The Southern Baptist Journal of Theology is an academic journal published by Southern Baptist Theological Seminary. It was founded in 1997, after the seminary had lost control of Review and Expositor.

SBJT is published quarterly. The inaugural editor was Paul R. House, while the current editor is Stephen J. Wellum.

References

External links

Journal of Theology
Academic journals published by universities and colleges
Protestant studies journals
Publications established in 1997
Quarterly journals
Mass media in Louisville, Kentucky